LGBT rights in Washington may refer to:

 LGBT rights in Washington (state)
 LGBT rights in Washington, D.C.